Kirchschlag in der Buckligen Welt is a municipality in the district of Wiener Neustadt-Land in the Austrian state of Lower Austria.

Population

Culture
Kirchschlag is one of 12 locations (Passionsspielorte) in Austria performing passion play .
Passion play is performed every 5 years and next will be 2020. This can be noticed by increased beard growth in the male population starting the year prior to the Passion play.

References

Bucklige Welt
Cities and towns in Wiener Neustadt-Land District